Soundview Preparatory School was an independent, co-ed day school for grades 6 – 12 that was located on a 13-acre campus in Yorktown Heights, New York in northern Westchester County. Founded in the spring of 1989 by William Glyn Hearn, the School had an enrollment of approximately 60 students at the time of its closure. Students came from Westchester, Putnam and Rockland Counties in New York State and from Fairfield County in Connecticut, as well as from New York City.

Soundview Preparatory School closed its doors on February 3, 2020, for budgetary reasons.

Extracurricular activities
Soundview had many clubs, each one hosted by a teacher, where students could meet others who shared an immediate interest. Some clubs offered in the past were the Knitting Club, the Politics Club, the Franchise Club, the Chess Club, the Drama Club, the Community Service Club, and the Yearbook Club. Usually, the clubs met once a week.

Soundview's athletes were the Soundview Bulldogs, and sports played throughout the year included soccer, basketball, bowling and Ultimate Frisbee.  To foster a sense of community and school spirit, all students were encouraged to attend at least some games.
In past years, the school had had an annual trip to a foreign country, and students had been able to visit England, Italy, Greece, China, Russia, Spain, and Argentina.

References

1989 establishments in New York (state)
Educational institutions established in 1989
Private high schools in Westchester County, New York
Private middle schools in Westchester County, New York
Alternative schools in the United States
Educational institutions disestablished in 2020
2020 disestablishments in New York (state)